Woleu  is a department of Woleu-Ntem Province in northern Gabon. The capital lies at Oyem. It borders Equatorial Guinea to the west. It had a population of 74,403 in 2013.

Towns and villages

References

Woleu-Ntem Province
Departments of Gabon